Jagršče is a settlement in the hills above the Idrijca Valley in the Municipality of Cerkno in the traditional Littoral region of Slovenia.

The parish church in the village is dedicated to Saint Ursula and belongs to the Koper Diocese.

References

External links
Jagršče on Geopedia

Populated places in the Municipality of Cerkno